Spain competed at the 1924 Summer Olympics in Paris, France. 95 competitors, 93 men and 2 women, took part in 44 events in 15 sports.

Athletics

Thirteen athletes represented Spain in 1924. It was the nation's second appearance in the sport.

Ranks given are within the heat.

Boxing 

Seven boxers represented Spain at the 1924 Games. It was the nation's debut in the sport. Biete and Sánchez were the most successful Spanish boxers, each reaching the quarterfinals.

Diving

Three divers, all men, represented Spain in 1924. It was the nation's debut in the sport.
Ranks given are within the heat.
 Men

Equestrian

Four equestrians represented Spain in 1924. It was the nation's debut in the sport.

Fencing

13 fencers, all men, represented Spain in 1924. It was the nation's second appearance in the sport, and first since 1900.

 Men

Ranks given are within the pool.

Football

Spain competed in the Olympic football tournament for the second time in 1924. In an unfortunate draw for them (and Italy), they faced Italy in the first round. The Italians came out the better, though it was a Spanish own goal that was the difference in the otherwise scoreless match.

 Round 1

Final rank 17th place

Polo

Spain sent a polo team to the Olympics for the second time in 1924. The Spanish team finished fourth in the five-team round-robin.

Ranks given are within the pool.

Rowing

Ten rowers represented Spain in 1924. It was the nation's second appearance in the sport, and first since 1900.

Ranks given are within the heat.

Sailing

Three sailors represented Spain in 1924. It was the nation's debut in the sport.

Shooting

Swimming

Ranks given are within the heat.
 Men

Tennis

 Men

 Women

 Mixed

Water polo

Spain made its second Olympic water polo appearance.
Roster
Manuel Basté
 Antonio Bretos Muzas
 Jaime Cruells Folguera
 Jaime Fontanet
 Francesc Gibert
 Lluís Gibert
 Enrique Granados Gal
 José María Puig
 J. Trigo
 Mariano Trigo
 Alfonso Tusell Alonso

First round
 Bye
Quarterfinals

Wrestling

Greco-Roman

 Men's

References

External links
Spanish Olympic Committee
Official Olympic Reports

Nations at the 1924 Summer Olympics
1924
Oly